Edmund Wong Chun-sek is a Hong Kong accountant and DAB politician who was the president of the Society of Chinese Accountants and Auditors in 2020.

Wong is the first Legislative Council member to caught Covid-19.

Electoral history

References 

Living people
Year of birth missing (living people)
HK LegCo Members 2022–2025
Hong Kong pro-Beijing politicians